Marica Stražmešter (Serbian Cyrillic: Марица Cтражмештер, born 28 August 1981) is a two-time Serbian Olympic swimmer. Stražmešter represented FR Yugoslavia at the 2000 Summer Olympics in 100 and 200m backstroke. Eight years later, she represented Serbia at the 2008 Summer Olympics in 100m backstroke. She is the Serbian record holder in 100m backstroke both in long and short course pools. She competed in Semifinals at European swimming championships, World championships.

Stražmešter became several times champion of Spain combining her swimming practices with her job as coach. She moved to United States in 2014 and decided to work with youth in schools

See also
 List of Serbian records in swimming

References

External links
 
 
 
 
 

1981 births
Living people
Serbian female swimmers
Swimmers at the 2000 Summer Olympics
Swimmers at the 2008 Summer Olympics
Olympic swimmers of Serbia
Olympic swimmers of Yugoslavia
Sportspeople from Kikinda
Yugoslav female swimmers